Janusz Brzozowski (born 29 June 1951) is a former Polish handball player who competed in the 1976 Summer Olympics and in the 1980 Summer Olympics.

In 1976 he won the bronze medal with the Polish team. Four years later he was part of the Polish team which finished seventh.

External links
Profile 

1951 births
Living people
Sportspeople from Szczecin
Polish male handball players
Handball players at the 1976 Summer Olympics
Handball players at the 1980 Summer Olympics
Olympic handball players of Poland
Olympic bronze medalists for Poland
Olympic medalists in handball
Medalists at the 1976 Summer Olympics
20th-century Polish people